is a Japanese professional wrestler currently working for the Japanese professional wrestling promotion DDT Pro-Wrestling (DDT).

Professional wrestling career

Dramatic Dream Team (2001-present)
Ohka made his professional wrestling debut on Dramatic Dream Team promotion's International Youth Festival ~ DDT Charity Pro Wrestling Evening Show ~ on October 13, 2001 in an exhibition match in a losing effort against Takashi Sasaki. He is a former multiple time Ironman Heavymetalweight Champion, last time challenging Futoshi Miwa for it at DDT D-Day on April 5, 2003 under the name of O.K. Revolution. Ohka won the KO-D Openweight Championship, DDT's most prestigious title on June 28, 2015 at King of DDT 2015 Tokyo in a three-way match against the champion Kudo and Yasu Urano. He led the #OhkaEmpire stable, in which he wrestled alongside Danshoku Dino and Super Sasadango Machine, members with which he hosted a custom-made show, the DDT #OhkaEmpire Produce "Muscle Mates 2015" on November 17, where he worked with personalities such as Hiroshi Tanahashi, Yohei Komatsu and Harashima. On September 27, 2015 at the "Who's Gonna Top?" event, Ohka teamed up with fellow stable mates Danshoku Dino and Super Sasadango Machine to defeat Team Dream Futures (Keisuke Ishii, Shigehiro Irie and Soma Takao) for the KO-D 6-Man Tag Team Championship. On July 7, 2016, he teamed up with Kai as Bad Comis to win the KO-D Tag Team Championship from Daisuke Sasaki and Shuji Ishikawa. He captured the KO-D 8-Man Tag Team Championship (by the time it was the Ten-Man Tag Team Championship) after teaming up with Makoto Oishi, LiLiCo, Ladybeard and Super Sasadango Machine on August 20 at Ryōgoku Peter Pan 2017 by defeating T2Hii (Toru Owashi and Kazuki Hirata), Joey Ryan, Saki Akai and Yoshihiko in a ten-person intergender tag team match to become the inaugural champions.

Independent circuit (2006-present)
Ohka is known for tenures with various professional wrestling promotions. On March 18, 2017, Ohka defeated Shiori Asahi to win the Independent Junior Heavyweight Championship at K-DOJO Club-K Super In Blue Field, event promoted by Kaientai Dojo. He worked a match for New Japan Pro-Wrestling at the NJPW NEVER.6 ~ Road To The Super Junior Tournament on April 16, 2011 where he teamed up with Kaji Tomato, Marines Mask and Osamu Namiguchi in a losing effort to Gedo, Jado, Tetsuya Naito and Yujiro Takahashi of Chaos.

Personal life
Ohka attended courses at the Nihon University in Tokyo.

Championships and accomplishments
Dramatic Dream Team/DDT Pro-Wrestling
KO-D Openweight Championship (1 time)
KO-D Tag Team Championship (1 time) – with Kai
KO-D 6-Man Tag Team Championship (1 time) – with Danshoku Dino and Super Sasadango Machine
KO-D 10-Man Tag Team Championship (1 time) – with Makoto Oishi, LiLiCo, Ladybeard and Super Sasadango Machine
Ironman Heavymetalweight Championship (8 times)
GWC 6-Man Tag Team Championship (2 times) – with Miss Mongol and Yumehito Imanari
Independent World Junior Heavyweight Championship (2 times)
Sea Of Japan 6-Person Tag Team Championship (1 time) – with Mr. Strawberry and Yoshihiro Sakai
Uchicomi! Openweight Ultimate Championship (1 time)
Ganbare☆Climax (2017)
STYLE-E Pro Wrestling
STYLE-E Openweight Championship (1 time)
STYLE-E Tag Team Championship (1 time) – with Ganbee Takanashi
SE Tag Team Tournament (2011) – with Ganbee Takanashi

References 

1977 births
Living people
Japanese male professional wrestlers
21st-century professional wrestlers
Independent World Junior Heavyweight Champions
Ironman Heavymetalweight Champions
KO-D 6-Man Tag Team Champions
KO-D 8-Man/10-Man Tag Team Champions
KO-D Tag Team Champions
Sea of Japan 6-Person Tag Team Champions
KO-D Openweight Champions